Bulgaria is a country in southeastern Europe situated entirely in the Balkan peninsula. Bulgaria is inhabited by 22 autochthonous amphibian species, which makes the amphibians the least diverse class of vertebrates in the country. They include nine species of newts and salamanders from a single family, Salamandridae, as well as 13 frog and toad species from five families—Bombinatoridae, Bufonidae, Hylidae, Pelobatidae and Ranidae. The most recently classified species are the northern crested newt, identified in 2005, and the Macedonian crested newt, identified in 2007. In 2017 genetic studies suggested that the smooth newt was a species complex and was split in six species, of which three are found in Bulgaria—the smooth newt sensu lato, the Greek smooth newt and the Schmidtler's smooth newt. Some of the most common species include the European green toad, yellow-bellied toad, and marsh frog.

The foundations of Bulgarian herpetology (the study of amphibians and reptiles) were laid in the end of the 19th century by the teacher Vasil Kovachev, who published a number of articles on the subject and the 1912 book Herpetologic Fauna of Bulgaria. In the 1930s and 1940s zoologist Ivan Buresh and his associate Yordan Tsonkov conducted in-depth research on the diversity and distribution of the amphibian and reptile species in the country. In the second half of the 20th century the leading Bulgarian herpetologist was Dr. Vladimir Beshkov.

Bulgaria provides various habitats for amphibians. The country falls within six terrestrial ecoregions of the Palearctic realm: Balkan mixed forests, Rodope montane mixed forests, Euxine-Colchic deciduous forests, Aegean and Western Turkey sclerophyllous and mixed forests, East European forest steppe and Pontic–Caspian steppe. Bulgaria has varied topography. From north to south the main geomorphological regions are the Danubian Plain, the Balkan Mountains, the Sub-Balkan valleys, the Rila–Rhodope massif to the south-west, the Upper Thracian Plain and the Strandzha mountains to the south-east. The country has a dense network of rivers but with the notable exception of the Danube, they are mostly short and with low water flow. The average annual precipitation is 670 mm; the rainfall is lower in the lowlands and higher in the mountains. The driest region is Dobrudzha in the north-eastern part of the Danubian Plain (450 mm), while the highest rainfall has been measured in the upper valley of the river Ogosta in the western Balkan Mountains (2293 mm).

List of species

Order Caudata

Family Salamandridae 
Salamandridae, or true salamanders, are a family of terrestrial and aquatic salamanders, mostly distributed in Asia and Europe, although some species are found in North Africa and North America. Most species have slightly toxic skin secretions and many develop dorsal body and tail fins when they return to an aquatic stage. There are 109 species in 21 genera; of these, nine species in four genera are found in Bulgaria.

Order Anura

Family Bombinatoridae 
Bombinatoridae are an Old World toad family often referred to as fire-bellied toads because of their brightly coloured ventral sides which demonstrate their high toxicity. It includes ten species in two genera, Barbourula and Bombina, both of which have flattened bodies, of which two species from genus Bombina occur in Bulgaria.

Family Bufonidae 
Bufonidae are a family of toads native to every continent except Australia and Antarctica. Bufonidae include the typical toads with shortened forelimbs, hindlimbs used for walking or hopping, dry warty skin, and parotoid glands behind eyes. The family contains 590 species in 50 genera, of which 2 species from genus Bufo are found in Bulgaria.

Family Hylidae 
Hylidae or tree frogs are the most diverse amphibian family with 951 species in 51 genera, and worldwide distribution. Most species inhabit tropical areas with warm and humid climate, especially the Neotropics. Hylids range from small to large in size and usually have distinct adhesive toe discs that contain a cartilage offsetting the terminal phalanx, which aids in climbing. The only genus found in Europe is Hyla, with 6 species out of 37 worldwide, and one in Bulgaria.

Family Pelobatidae 
Pelobatidae, also known as spadefoot toads, are a small family of frogs with one genus and four species spread in Europe, Western Asia and North-western Africa. Two of the four species inhabit the country.

Family Ranidae 
Ranidae are a widespread family also known as true frogs. They have generalized frog body plans and a generalized aquatic tadpole stage. The family includes 379 species in 14 genera, of which six species in two genera occur in Bulgaria.

See also

Geography of Bulgaria
List of birds of Bulgaria
List of mammals of Bulgaria
List of reptiles of Bulgaria
List of protected areas of Bulgaria

Footnotes

Notes

Citations

References

Sources

External links 
 
 
 
 

Lists of biota of Bulgaria
Bulgaria
Bulgaria
Amphibians